The Bavin ministry was the 44th ministry of the New South Wales Government, and was led by the 24th Premier, Thomas Bavin, in a Nationalist coalition with the Country Party, led by Ernest Buttenshaw.

Bavin was first elected to the New South Wales Legislative Assembly in 1917 and served continuously until 1935. Having served as a senior minister in the first and second Fuller ministries, in 1925 Bavin was elected leader of the Nationalist Party in New South Wales and became Leader of the Opposition. Buttenshaw was also first elected to the Assembly in 1917 and served continuously until 1938. Initially a member of the Nationalist Party, in 1922 he helped establish the Progressive Party and became a member of its successor, the Country Party, and elected as party leader in 1925.

Following an agreement by the Nationalist and Country parties not to stand candidates against each other, the coalition won the 1927 state election, defeating the Labor government led by Jack Lang. Bavin became Premier and Colonial Treasurer; and Buttenshaw, a senior minister.

This ministry covers the period from 18 October 1927 until 3 November 1930 when the 1930 state election was held in the wake of the Great Depression resulting in the loss of the Coalition, with Lang regaining government as the third Lang ministry.

Composition of ministry
The composition of the ministry was announced by Premier Bavin on 18 October 1927 and covers the period up to 3 November 1930. 

 
Ministers are members of the Legislative Assembly unless otherwise noted.

See also

Members of the New South Wales Legislative Assembly, 1927-1930
Members of the New South Wales Legislative Council, 1927-1930

References

New South Wales ministries
1927 establishments in Australia
1930 disestablishments in Australia